Emeric Bergeaud (1818–1858) was a Haitian novelist. His best-known work, Stella, was the first Haitian novel. Born in Cayes, he served as Secretary to Jerome Maximilien Borgella and later participated in a revolt against President Soulouque. Exiled to Saint Thomas, it was there that he wrote the novel Stella.  Marlene Daut has recently revealed in Tropics of Haiti: Race and the Literary History of the Haitian Revolution in the Atlantic World, 1789-1865,  that three Haitian journalists and writers from the early twentieth-century, Ulrick Duvivier, Frédéric Marcelin, and Louis Morpeau, suspected or more likely erroneously believed that Stella was actually authored by Bergeaud's wife (413-14, ftn. 2). At the present time, there is no other known evidence that supports the claims of Duvivier, Marcelin, and Morpeau.

References

 
 Daut, Marlene L. Tropics of Haiti: Race and the Literary History of the Haitian Revolution in the Atlantic World, 1789-1865 (Liverpool University Press, 2015).

External links
Stella is openly available with full text and full page images in the Digital Library of the Caribbean

1818 births
1858 deaths
19th-century Haitian novelists
Haitian male novelists
19th-century male writers